The 1972 Torneo Descentralizado, the top category of Peruvian football, was played by 16 teams. The season was divided into 3 stages. The first stage was contested in two groups: Metropolitan (teams from Lima and Callao) and Regional (teams from the rest of the country); each group winner qualified for the Championship Group. The second stage was the Descentralised (league tournament); the top 4 qualified for the Championship Group and the bottom 2 were relegated. Championship Group was contested by 6 teams in Lima; neither team carried their previous records. The national champion was Sporting Cristal.

Teams

First stage

Metropolitan group

Regional group

Tiebreaker

Torneo Descentralizado

Final group

External links 
 Peru 1972 season at RSSSF

Torneo Descentralizado, 1972
Peru
Peruvian Primera División seasons